A list of the films produced in Mexico in 1956 (see 1956 in film):

1956

See also
1956 in Mexico

External links

1956
Films
Mexican